Campbellton is a house near Gerrardstown, West Virginia built circa 1800 by James Campbell. Campbell, who was born in Ireland in 1744, arrived in America with his father in 1753, settling in Berkeley County, West Virginia in 1762. Campbell built a store on the property in 1780, along with a complex of accessory buildings, before building the main house.

The main house is a two-story structure of coursed rubble limestone. The two-story house is five bays wide. A rear kitchen ell was demolished due to deterioration, but was reconstructed in 1975 in a manner sympathetic to the main house. in 1975. The main block is a center-hall plan, with two rooms to each side of the stair hall.  Outbuildings include the store, which retains its original shelving. An 1802 barn completes the ensemble.

The house was listed on the National Register of Historic Places in 1980.

References

Houses on the National Register of Historic Places in West Virginia
Georgian architecture in West Virginia
Houses in Berkeley County, West Virginia
Houses completed in 1780
National Register of Historic Places in Berkeley County, West Virginia